Cinamolol is a beta blocker.

References

Beta blockers
Methyl esters
Cinnamate esters
N-isopropyl-phenoxypropanolamines
Secondary alcohols